The 2004 Copa América knockout stage was the elimination stage of the Copa América, following the group stage. It began on 17 July 2004 and consisted of the quarter-finals, the semi-finals, the third-place play-off, and the final held at the National Stadium of Peru on 25 July, in Lima. No extra time was to be played if any match in the final stages finished tied after regulation; the match would go straight to a penalty shoot-out.

All times are in local, Peru Time (UTC−05:00).

Qualified teams
The top two placed teams from each of the three groups, plus the two best-placed third teams, qualified for the knockout stage.

Bracket

Quarter-finals

Peru v Argentina

Colombia v Costa Rica

Paraguay v Uruguay

Mexico v Brazil

Semi-finals

Argentina v Colombia

Brazil v Uruguay

Third-place match

Final

External links
2004 Copa América at RSSSF

Final stages
2004 in Peruvian football
2004 in Colombian football
Argentina at the 2004 Copa América
2004 in Uruguayan football
2003–04 in Mexican football
Brazil at the 2004 Copa América
2004 in Paraguayan football
2003–04 in Costa Rican football